Santa Cruz, officially the Municipality of Santa Cruz,  is a 1st class municipality in the province of Occidental Mindoro, Philippines. According to the 2020 census, it has a population of 42,417 people.

Santa Cruz was formerly known as Talabasi during the precolonial era.

History 
Santa Cruz was created as a pueblo during the Spanish regime. During the American regime, it became a part of Mamburao as a barrio, along with Paluan and Abra de Ilog.

On April 1, 1949, Santa Cruz was created as a municipality once again, by virtue of Executive Order 210, signed by president Elpidio Quirino.

Geography

Barangays
Santa Cruz is politically subdivided into 11 barangays.
 Alacaak
 Barahan
 Casague
 Dayap
 Lumangbayan
 Mulawin
 Pinagturilan (San Pedro)
 Poblacion I (Barangay 1)
 San Vicente
 Poblacion II (Barangay 2)
 Kurtinganan

Climate

Demographics

Economy

Government

Elected officials
Municipal council (2013 – 2016):
 Mayor: Meriam Leycano - Quijano
 Vice Mayor: Ernesto P. Torreliza
 Sangguniang Bayan:
 Xernan C. Malabanan
 Evangeline R. Umali
 Annie Nitoy Tria
 Mark Galsim
 Leonardo F. Abeleda Jr.
 Ronie P. Alegria
 Johnny Ramos
 Antonio Luis B. de Borja III
 SB Secretary: Euzaida G. Viray

List of former chief executives
 Santiago Vidal (1952–1955)
 Teodoro Malabanan (1956–1959)
 Marta A. Viaña (1960–1963)
 Florante A. Tria (1964–1967, 1972–1986)
 Nestor Abeleda (1968–1971)
 Jesus T. Abeleda (1986)
 Manuel Miclat (1986–1987)
 Marceliano Morales (1987–1988)
 Purificacion T. Abeleda (1988–1992)
 Artemio S. Abeleda (1992–2001)
 Filemon M. Galsim (2001–2004, 2007–)
 Leonardo R. Abeleda (2004–2007)

References

External links
Santa Cruz Profile at PhilAtlas.com
[ Philippine Standard Geographic Code]
Philippine Census Information
Local Governance Performance Management System

Municipalities of Occidental Mindoro
Establishments by Philippine executive order